Vishwanath Das Shastri is an Indian politician.  He was elected to the Lok Sabha, the lower house of the Parliament of India from the Sultanpur, Uttar Pradesh as a member of the Bharatiya Janata Party.

References

External links
Official biographical sketch in Parliament of India website

India MPs 1991–1996
Lok Sabha members from Uttar Pradesh
Bharatiya Janata Party politicians from Uttar Pradesh
1950 births
Living people